Stephen Burton (born December 11, 1989) is a former American football wide receiver. He was drafted by the Minnesota Vikings in the seventh round of the 2011 NFL Draft. He played college football at West Texas A&M. On April 23, 2014, Burton had retired due to concussion concern.

Early years
Although having great talent at wide receiver, Burton was offered no scholarships from any college. He eventually chose to attend the Junior College, Long Beach City College.

College years
While attending Long Beach, Burton played wide receiver and was the kick returner for the team. In 2007, he was named team MVP and won Second-team All-Conference as a wide receiver. After playing for Long Beach for his freshman and sophomore years, Burton decided to transfer to University of Oklahoma. However, Burton was unable to obtain enough credits to transfer and eventually decided to attend the Division II school, West Texas A&M. In his first season playing in a spread offense at West Texas A&M, he had three 100-yard receiving games. During his second year Burton had three 100-yard receiving games again and also had 70 receptions for 1,021 yards and 11 touchdowns.

Professional career

2011 NFL Combine

Minnesota Vikings
Burton was drafted by the Vikings in the seventh round of the 2011 NFL Draft. He was signed to the Minnesota Vikings' active roster on October 25, 2011. His promotion was in response to the Vikings releasing wide receiver Bernard Berrian. Burton scored his first NFL touchdown with the Vikings on September 16, 2012 against the Indianapolis Colts. It was a 6-yard reception that was tipped by tight end Kyle Rudolph. Burton was released by the Vikings on August 31, 2013 (along with 18 others) to get to a 53-man roster.

Jacksonville Jaguars
Burton was claimed off waivers by the Jacksonville Jaguars on September 1, 2013. He was placed on injured reserve on December 9, 2013 due to a concussion. On April 23, 2014, Burton retired at the age of 24 due to concussion concerns.

Calgary Stampeders 
On January 26, 2015, Burton unretired and signed a contract with the Calgary Stampeders of the Canadian Football League.

Winnipeg Blue Bombers
On May 11, 2017, Burton signed with the Winnipeg Blue Bombers of the Canadian Football League. He was placed on the suspension list on May 28, 2017, and his contract expired at the end of the season.

References

External links
 
 Minnesota Vikings bio
 West Texas A&M football bio

1989 births
Living people
People from Lakewood, California
Players of American football from California
Sportspeople from Los Angeles County, California
American football wide receivers
Canadian football wide receivers
American players of Canadian football
Long Beach City Vikings football players
West Texas A&M Buffaloes football players
Minnesota Vikings players
Jacksonville Jaguars players
Calgary Stampeders players